The 2015 World Rally Championship was the 43rd season of the World Rally Championship, an auto racing championship recognised by the Fédération Internationale de l'Automobile as the highest class of international rallying. Teams and drivers contest thirteen rallies across four continents, competing for the FIA World Rally Championships for Drivers and Manufacturers. The WRC-2, WRC-3 and Junior WRC championships are run in support of the premier championship.

Sébastien Ogier started the season as the defending drivers' champion.  His team, Volkswagen Motorsport, were the defending manufacturers' champions.
Both Ogier and Volkswagen Motorsport claimed their third consecutive drivers' and manufacturers' championships with 3 rounds to spare by winning in Rally Australia.

Calendar
The 2015 calendar was announced at a meeting of the FIA World Motor Sport Council in Beijing in September 2014. The season maintained the same rallies as the 2014 season and was contested over thirteen rounds in Europe, North America, South America and Oceania.

Notes:
 — The Rallies of Germany and France were provisional inclusions subject to negotiation of a new agreement between their organisers and series promoters.

Calendar changes
 The Rallye Monte Carlo adopted Rally-2 regulations, allowing retired competitors to restart the event the next day with a time penalty. Prior to 2015, the Rallye Monte Carlo was the only event being run without Rally-2 regulations.
 The Rallies of Portugal and Argentina swapped places in the calendar.
 The Rally of Portugal moved from its base in the town of Faro in the Algarve region—where it had been headquartered from 2007 until 2014—and relocated to the country's north, its original home prior until its removal from the calendar in 2002.
 On 6 February 2015, the Fédération Française du Sport Automobile (FFSA) announced that the Tour de Corse would replace the Rallye de France Alsace on the calendar for financial reasons.

Teams and drivers
The following teams and drivers are scheduled to compete in the World Rally Championship during the 2015 season:

Driver changes
 Mikko Hirvonen retired from rallying at the World Championship at the end of the 2014 season. His place was taken by Ott Tänak, who returned to the World Rally Championship after a season in the sport's second-tier category, the World Rally Championship-2.
 Nine-time World Champion Sébastien Loeb returned to the series for the Monte Carlo Rally, competing in a Citroën DS3 WRC with the Citroën World Rally Team. Mads Østberg remains with the team, driving a non-manufacturer DS3 in Monte Carlo before taking over from Loeb later in the season.

Changes

Regulation changes
 Competitors who fail to contest a special stage without being able to show cause receive a seven-minute time penalty.
 Selected rounds of the 2015 season are included in the newly created FIA R-GT Cup—with the remaining rounds taken from the European Rally Championship calendar—for Grand Touring cars entered under Group R-GT regulations.
 The running order is in championship order for the first two legs of the rally. On the last leg, P1 and P2 crews run in reverse classification order.
 The transmission of performance data or information to or from a competing car, not in relation with safety, is forbidden during special stages to help promote greater competition.
  A car which has not started from the start line within 20 seconds will be considered as retired and will be able to restart under Rally 2 on the subsequent day.

Rally summaries

Round 1 — Monte Carlo Rally

Defending World Champion Sébastien Ogier started the season with a win in Monte Carlo, his second consecutive in the principality and the 25th of his WRC career. Returning nine-time World Champion Sébastien Loeb was the early leader of the rally, losing first position to Ogier on the seventh stage after a spin while negotiating a hairpin bend. On the next stage, Loeb hit a rock and lost a total of six minutes, before retiring in the following liaison section. This gave Ogier a lead of almost two minutes over Volkswagen teammate Jari-Matti Latvala. Despite being unable to monitor his rivals' split times during the stages under new rules, Ogier blended a controlled pace with safe tyre choices through the final two days to seal the victory. Latvala finished second, also taking one power stage point, with Andreas Mikkelsen completing a one-two-three for Volkswagen Motorsport. Citroën's Mads Østberg finished the event in fourth position. Hyundai Motorsport duo Thierry Neuville and Dani Sordo finished in fifth and sixth, split by 0.8 seconds. M-Sport's Elfyn Evans finished seventh, having dropped time after he damaged his car's rear suspension against a wall. Evans finished ahead of Loeb, who rejoined under rally-2 rules and won two power stage points. The top ten was completed by Martin Prokop and Kris Meeke, who won the power stage to take three additional points.

Round 2 — Rally Sweden

Sébastien Ogier won the rally on the last stage to extend his lead in the drivers' championship. The rally started with Pontus Tidemand, competing in a WRC-2 Ford Fiesta RRC, winning the Thursday night super special stage in Karlstad. Ogier took the lead on Friday's opening stage, with teammate Jari-Matti Latvala chasing him for the lead. Volkswagen's third driver, Andreas Mikkelsen gained the lead on the ninth stage, after Ogier and Latvala both hit snow banks, dropping to 4th and 23rd respectively. Mikkelsen kept the lead until Saturday's final stage, where Hyundai's Thierry Neuville took the lead after fitting new tyres for the stage; Mikkelsen and Ogier were both in contention however, at deficits of 1.5 and 9.6 seconds respectively. Mikkelsen regained the lead on Sunday's opening stage, and held a three-second lead over Ogier ahead of the final stage, Värmullsåsen, which was also the event's power stage, offering additional drivers' championship points.

Running in reverse order to their rally positions, Ogier bested Neuville's time for the stage – ultimately, the stage's fastest time – and just after he completed the stage, Mikkelsen hit a snow bank and lost 40 seconds to fall behind Neuville in the standings as well. Ott Tänak finished fourth to record his best WRC result since 2012, while Hayden Paddon recorded his best WRC finish – replacing the injured Dani Sordo – in fifth position. Next in the order was British duo Elfyn Evans and Kris Meeke, Martin Prokop finished eighth ahead of Yuriy Protasov, who took his first WRC stage win, on the Kirkenær stage. Completing the championship points was Mads Østberg, who was in position for a podium spot, until he hit a snow bank on the eleventh stage. He also scored an extra point by finishing third on the power stage. After the last stage, Volkswagen Motorsport decided to retire Latvala's car – he had managed to recover up the order to 12th place – due to a rules loophole in relation to the following event, Rally México.

Round 3 — Rally Mexico

Sébastien Ogier began the event by winning the shakedown, before the rally proper opened with a night-time special stage in the tunnels of Guanajuato city, a World Heritage Site as denoted by UNESCO. Thierry Neuville became the first leader of the event by winning the stage, in front of Lorenzo Bertelli.

The second day of the event began with the first gravel section of the 2015 season, where Ogier took the opportunity to jump into the lead despite having the difficult task of sweeping the roads; he had been doing so as the championship leader. On the third stage, Ott Tänak lost control of his Ford Fiesta RS WRC and left the road, with his car falling into a reservoir. Tänak and co-driver Raigo Mõlder managed to evacuate the car before it submerged. Kris Meeke, who won the stage that Tänak crashed out on, crashed out of the rally on the following stage, irreversibly damaging his Citroën DS3 WRC. The morning also saw the retirements of Robert Kubica and Hayden Paddon.

Thierry Neuville was driving quickly in second overall when he crashed on the eighth stage, leaving Jari-Matti Latvala in second position at the end of the second day. Tänak's car was recovered from the reservoir, and the M-Sport World Rally Team were able to repair the car for use the next day. However, the car failed just after leaving service, and the car was retired for the day. Tänak did compete on the final trio of stages and was able to finish the rally in 22nd overall. On the final day, Latvala started in pursuit of Ogier, but he would ultimately finish 15th overall after broken suspension caused damage to a rear wheel. Ogier ultimately won his fifth successive rally, collecting maximum points with a power stage win. The fight for second place was between Mads Østberg and Andreas Mikkelsen, with Østberg prevailing by 6.3 seconds. Elfyn Evans matched his best WRC result in fourth, in front of Hyundai's Dani Sordo, returning from injury.

Round 4 — Rally Argentina

Kris Meeke won a WRC rally for the first time in his career, the first time a British driver had won a WRC event since the 2002 World Rally Championship season Safari Rally, which was won by Colin McRae. Meeke dedicated the victory to McRae, who had been his mentor.

This event was the first time Citroën had won a rally since (2013 Rallye Deutschland), and the first one-two since 2012 Rally Finland, as Mads Østberg finished second. Elfyn Evans, in a Ford Fiesta WRC, took the first podium of his career. This event was the first time Volkswagen hadn't finished on the podium since their return to the WRC.

The rally was notable for its high level of attrition; only five World Rally Cars finished the event without experiencing mechanical problems. The second stage saw double world champion Sébastien Ogier stop with an injector problem, whilst Lorenzo Bertelli also retired on this stage. On the following stages, Andreas Mikkelsen and Hayden Paddon both experienced technical problems, with both drivers restarting on the following day. Ott Tänak lost a wheel on the fourth stage, but also restarted on the following day. On the second day, Paddon crashed out on the ninth stage, whilst Dani Sordo stopped with power steering problems on the following stage; both drivers restarted on the final day. On the final day, Jari-Matti Latvala suffered an engine failure on the eleventh stage, whilst Mikkelsen and Thierry Neuville both crashed in the same place on the final stage. Østberg had also experienced engine problems on the opening stage, but was able to recover to second.

Ogier won the power stage on the way to finishing 17th overall; Sordo was second on the power stage, as he recovered to fifth, and Østberg finished third.

Round 5 — Rally de Portugal

14 years later, the Rally de Portugal returned to be held in the North of the country, returning to the sections that earned it the World Best Rally award for 6 times, and the people joined massively.

The race began with the return of the mythical Special Stage at Lousada racing track, with 15,000 spectators. As in the shakedown, Andreas Mikkelsen was the fastest, followed by Sébastien Ogier and Jari-Matti Latvala. Robert Kubica took the all-new Ford Fiesta RS WRC (premiered by M-Sport at Rally of Portugal) to 4th place.

On the second day of the race, the competition played in the Minho Province, with the section of Caminha proving to be quite hard, causing several dropouts and mechanical breakdowns. Ogier on WRC leader condition had the difficult task of opening the road, had a flat tyre right at the SS 2 and finished the day in 2nd overall. At the end of the SS 5 (2nd passage through Ponte de Lima was canceled due to a forest fire) Latvala was the leader with 11.1 seconds ahead of Kris Meeke, and 16 s on Mikelsen. Sordo, winner of the first special of the day (SS 2) was only 5th.

On Saturday, Ogier regained some handicap, winning the second day passes and finished the third day on 2nd place 9.5 seconds behind the leader, Latvala. Meeke won two of the SS and was 3rd, 20 s behind the leader but had Mikelsen (who won the other SS) at just 1.1 s. Elfyn Evans left after the first SS (as in the previous day) with electrical problems in the Ford Fiesta RS WRC, while Tänak and Sordo, already at more than a minute behind the lead were out of the fight for a podium finish. Neuville overturned and Ostberg suffered engine problems in his Citroën.

The title decision was reserved for Sunday, with the dispute of the mythical passages of Fafe (2 passes, with the second being the power-stage) and Cabreira (the longest of the rally with 32 km, now called the "Vieira do Minho" ). On the first pass by Fafe, and benefiting from a better position on the road, Ogier took 1.7 s the downside to Latvala, but at Serra da Cabreira Latvala responded and increased the advantage to 10.4 s. Mikelsen Volkswagen closed the podium. In the decisive power-stage, Ogier recovered 2.2 s at Latvala, insufficient to prevent the Finn to celebrate the triumph.

Round 6 — Rally Italia Sardegna

The rally began with a surprising Martin Prokop winning the Super Special Stage of Cagliari, followed by Dani Sordo (penalized for false start) and Mikkelsen. On the second day, new surprise with Hayden Paddon winning the first Friday 3 sections, and at the end of SS 4 led the rally with 25.3 s lead over Latvala and Ogier on 27.5. In the remaining stages, Paddon controlled the pace, but a slight touch on the last stage reduced the advantage  to only 8.8 s, now on Ogier who had exceeded his teammate. Dani Sordo was forced to leave after booting a wheel while Neuville suffered from problems such as turbo and handbrake and finished 6th. Meeke gave-up at SS 2 and Kubica did the same on the next.

It was necessary to reach the SS 17 and a spinning from Paddon for a VW take the rally lead. Ostberg was third, despite having traveled 20 km with a slow tyre leakage, having won 2 PEC before having new slow tyre leakage in the last SS. In this day Mikkelsen (lost a wheel) Sordo (lack of gas pressure), Kubica (3 holes and a stuck gearbox) and Tänak (gearbox jammed when he was 3rd place) dropped out while there were many hardships to Neuville (whipping-top, turbo and steering problems and 40s penalty) and Latvala (hole and crashed shock absorber for 2 sections). At the end of the day Ogier had a huge advantage over Paddon (2m13s) while Ostberg was 3 to 3m25s and Neuville 4th at 3m57s.

For the last day the attention was concentrated in the fight for the last podium spot between Ostberg and Neuville. An outwit from Ostberg (dropped to 5) delivered the 3rd to the Belgian. The power-stage was completely dominated by VW: Ogier, Latvala and Mikkelsen.

Round 7 — Rally Poland

Yet in the shakedown, Kris Meeke had an accident that forced him to move on foot at the departure ceremony. Sebastien Ogier won the opening Super Special, followed by privates Robert Kubica and Martin Prokop.
On the 2nd day Ott Tänak took the starting position (11th on the road) and won 3 sections. However, Ogier increased the pace, and benefiting from Tänak problems, was the leader at the end of SS 7.
On the 3rd day, Ogier held the lead while Tänak pressed and passed Latvala to get the final podium spot behind Mikkelsen. Elfyn Evans abandoned with trouble in the water pump, Hayden Paddon was the best Hyundai while the Citroën were misplaced.
On the last day, Mikkelsen still tried the win, but the podium positions did not change. Latvala lost fourth place already on the link for assistance park to Hayden Paddon, who was the best Hyundai, a race in which four cars of the South Korean brand ended.

Round 8 — Rally Finland

Jari-Matti Latvala drove away from his teammate Sébastien Ogier. After the years 2010 and 2014 Latvala won his home rally for the third time. Meeke was holding the third place until he punctured on SS15. Mikkelsen and Paddon retired after crashes.

Round 9 — Rallye Deutschland

Sébastien Ogier won in front of his teammate Jari-Matti Latvala and Andreas Mikkelsen. He made thus a further major step towards world title number three. For Volkswagen it was the third triple victory of the season.

Round 10 — Rally Australia

The seventh rally win this year, Ogier after 2013 and 2014 also prematurely clinched the world champion title for 2015. Volkswagen won also its third Manufacturer Title in a row.

Round 11 — Tour de Corse

Round 12 — Rally Catalunya

Round 13 — Wales Rally GB

Notes
  – The Monte Carlo Rally was shortened, as overcrowding caused the ninth stage to be cancelled for safety reasons.
  – The Rally Argentina was shortened after Hayden Paddon's accident in the ninth stage in which six spectators were injured.
  – The Rally de Portugal was shortened after a forest fire caused the cancellation of the fifth stage.
  – The Rally Poland was shortened after the fourteenth stage was cancelled due to large crowds not responding to safety crews instructions.
  – The Tour De Corse was shortened after a flood that damaged the roads caused the cancellation of the second and fourth stage.

Results and standings

FIA World Rally Championship for Drivers

Points are awarded to the top ten classified finishers. There are also three bonus points awarded to the winner of the Power stage, two points for second place and one for third.

FIA World Rally Championship for Co-Drivers

Points are awarded to the top ten classified finishers. There are also three bonus points awarded to the winner of the Power stage, two points for second place and one for third.

FIA World Rally Championship for Manufacturers
Points are awarded to the top ten classified finishers.

References

External links

Official website of the World Rally Championship
 FIA World Rally Championship 2015 at ewrc-results.com

 
World Rally Championship seasons
World Rally Championship
World Rally Championship